Korkut Özal (29 May 1929 – 2 November 2016) was a Turkish engineer and politician. His cause of death in 2016 are respiratory and circulatory failure.

Academic career
Korkut Özal studied at the Faculty of Civil Engineering at Istanbul Technical University. He then completed his postgraduate studies in the United States between 1956 and 1957. He became a teacher at the Middle East Technical University after returning to Turkey. In 1965, he was awarded a professorship and became a lecturer at the State Academy of Architecture and Engineering.

Early political career
Özal entered politics through the National Salvation Party; he was elected as the party's deputy for Erzurum in the 1973 and 1977 elections. In 1974, he worked as the Minister of Food, Agriculture, and Livestock in the CHP-MSP coalition government, and later in the First Nationalist Front Government established in 1975. He served as the Interior Minister Second Nationalist Front cabinet in 1977 for six months. Shortly after the 1980 Turkish coup d'état Korkut Özal suffered a traffic accident on September 25, 1980, and withdrew from politics.

Later political life
His brother, Turgut Özal, served as president until his death in 1993, after which Korkut Özal re-entered politics through the Motherland Party and was elected as an Istanbul deputy in 1995. He chaired the Turkish Parliament’s Home Affairs Commission and the Turkish Parliamentary Group of the OSCE. He was critical of many of the policies of the Anasol-D government and resigned from the Motherland Party on August 13, 1997. He joined the newly established Democratic Party and was elected president of the party at the Democratic Party Congress on 28 September 1997. On March 22, 2001, he left the chairmanship of the Democratic Party.

Korkut Özal died on November 2, 2016, at his home in Istanbul. He was buried in the family plot in the Topkapi cemetery.

References

External links

1929 births
2016 deaths
Ministers of the Interior of Turkey
20th-century Turkish engineers
Burials at Topkapı Cemetery